Grihapravesh may refer to:

 Grihapravesha, a Hindu ceremony performed on the occasion of an individual's first time entering their new home.
 Grihapravesh (1954 film), Bengali film
 Grihapravesh (book), 1957 Gujarati short story collection
 Griha Pravesh, 1979 Hindi film
 Grihaprevesam, 1992 Malayalam film
 Gruhapravesha, 1991 Kannada film
 Gruhapravesam, 1976 Tamil film
 Gruha Pravesam, 1982 Telugu film